Local H is an American rock band originally formed by guitarist and vocalist Scott Lucas, bassist Matt Garcia, drummer Joe Daniels, and lead guitarist John Sparkman in Zion, Illinois in 1990. The members all met in high school in 1987 and founded Local H three years later. After Sparkman's departure in 1991 and Garcia's departure in 1993, Local H continued as an unorthodox two-piece setup.

Local H signed a record contract with Island Records in 1994, where they would go on to release three albums. The band's debut album, Ham Fisted (1995), was not a success and the band was nearly dropped, but the band remained on the label long enough to release their second album As Good as Dead (1996). The album was a success, selling over 320,000 copies and spawned a radio hit with "Bound for the Floor", which peaked at No. 5 on the US Alternative Billboard Chart and became the band's best known song. Local H's third album, Pack Up the Cats (1998), was a critical success and appeared on several best-of end of year lists, but did not perform as well commercially due to its promotion being negatively affected by a corporate merger involving Island's parent company, PolyGram. The following year, the band left Island, and Daniels was replaced by Brian St. Clair. By March 2002, Local H's first three albums had sold a combined total of 600,000 copies worldwide.

Local H's first album with St. Clair, Here Comes the Zoo (2002), was released through Palm Pictures. The band recorded three more albums, Whatever Happened to P.J. Soles? (2004), Twelve Angry Months (2008) and Hallelujah! I'm a Bum (2012), and four EPs with St. Clair, prior to his amicable departure in 2013. In November 2013, Ryan Harding was announced as the new drummer, and the band have since released two albums, Hey, Killer in 2015 and Lifers in 2020.

History

Joe Daniels era (1987–1999)
Local H formed as a result of a high school band that Scott Lucas and Matt Garcia were in called Rude Awakening, in 1987. In 1987, while attending high school in Zion, Scott Lucas and Joe Daniels began jamming together, along with Matt Garcia and John Sparkman. Local H was formed in 1990, performing their first show on April 20, 1990, at the University of Wisconsin in Whitewater. Sparkman left the band on April 4, 1991. Local H released Drum, their first extended play, in 1991. Garcia left on January 26, 1993, and Lucas and Daniels began looking for a replacement bassist. They eventually decided to carry on as a duo with Lucas handling bass guitar frequencies after having a high school friend, Tobey Flescher, modify his guitar with an added bass pickup and second output. Local H played their first show as a true duo on September 3, 1993.

Local H recorded and released three studio albums through Island Records with the Lucas/Daniels lineup: Ham Fisted (1995), As Good as Dead (1996), and Pack Up the Cats (1998). With As Good as Dead, the band found moderate commercial success with the single "Bound for the Floor" which rose to No. 5 on the US Alternative Billboard Chart and No. 10 on the US Hot Mainstream Rock Billboard Chart. The songs "Eddie Vedder" and "Fritz's Corner" additionally made Top 40 on the Alternative and Mainstream Rock Billboard Charts.

Brian St. Clair era (1999–2013)
In July 1999, after a complicated year with their label, Daniels left the group. He was replaced by former Triple Fast Action drummer Brian St. Clair, who had previously worked as a drum tech for Cheap Trick. Lucas and St. Clair released the band's fourth album Here Comes the Zoo in 2002 under the Palm Pictures record label. The No Fun EP followed in 2003 and their fifth album, Whatever Happened to P.J. Soles?, was released in April 2004 to favorable reviews.

In 2005, the band received a good deal of publicity after recording a cover of the Britney Spears single "Toxic." The track was the only studio recording featured on Alive '05, a 2005 live album that constituted the sixth major release from the band.

In 2008 the band released their sixth studio album Twelve Angry Months, a concept album in which each of the twelve songs represented a stage in a year long process of overcoming a failed relationship.

On April 5, 2011, the ICON release of the band's Island recordings became their first "best-of" compilation. In an April 22 interview with The Delaware County Daily Times, Lucas commented, "It's kinda weird but kinda cool because it doesn’t cover our entire career, so I was like, 'Let's call it The Island Years.'"

In a June 28 guest appearance on the movie review podcast/website "CinemaJaw," Lucas claimed that the next album would be out before the upcoming 2012 elections—mainly because so much of the album's content deals with it directly—expecting it to be released by February 2012. In the same interview, Lucas also suggested that a working title for the album was Hallelujah, I'm a Bum, named for a song from the Depression Era. On July 11, 2012, the band announced that their next studio effort, Hallelujah! I'm a Bum, would be released on September 18. A full track listing was also published.

In May 2012, the band launched a tour of small clubs and bars in preparation for release of a new album. In September 2016, Local H announced a North American club tour supporting Helmet.

On August 21, 2013, it was announced that St. Clair would be leaving the band after a brief farewell tour, in order to focus on his tour management company, Tour Time Productions. The departure was described as amicable and a mutual decision between Lucas and St. Clair.

Ryan Harding era (2013–present)
On November 4, 2013, Ryan Harding was announced as the new drummer.  Previously, Harding had played with Sullen (Shanna Kiel from Sullen performed on "5th Ave. Crazy" from Here Comes the Zoo in 2001) and Short & Sweet, who had opened for Local H. Nobody else was auditioned or considered, and Harding's first show with the band was on November 8, 2013. On April 22, 2014 the band released a studio single of their cover of the Lorde song "Team". In early 2015, the duo created a Pledgemusic campaign in order to help fund the production of their new album, titled Hey, Killer. The album was released on April 15, 2015 through G&P Records.

On March 29, 2016, Lucas announced on WKQX that the band would celebrate the 20th anniversary of As Good As Dead by playing shows where they perform the entire AGAD album with original drummer Joe Daniels in addition to other songs with Harding on drums.

In April 2017, Local H was announced as the winner of the 'Hit the Stage' contest, gaining the opportunity to open for Metallica on five dates of the WorldWired tour.

On January 1, 2018, the band announced a new live album from their 2017 European tour. The album, Live in Europe, was released on February 6, 2018.

On January 6, 2019, the band performed as the halftime entertainment of the Chicago Bears vs. Philadelphia Eagles NFL Wildcard Playoff game.

In January 2020, the band premiered a new single entitled "Turn the Bow", as well as announced an upcoming studio album entitled LIFERS, set to be released in April of the same year. The album was produced by veteran audio engineers Steve Albini and Andy Gerber, features members of Deer Tick and Naked Raygun, and was mixed by J. Robbins. On March 23, 2020, the band released the live video for their single "Hold That Thought."  LIFERS was released on April 10, 2020.

On October 22, 2021, the band performed at the Shaky Knees Music Festival.

Live shows

Local H is known for their frequent and energetic live shows. The members of the band can usually be found at their own merchandise table after shows, signing autographs and selling band T-shirts.

Local H also has a reputation for creative ideas with regards to its live shows. In addition to playing a show in Chicago every New Year's Eve, the band has also participated in several unconventional concerts over the years, such as allowing one fan to select an album name from a hat, and then playing that album in its entirety. In 2005, Local H performed an "all request tour" in which a ballot containing a breakdown of most of the bands' songs organized into various categories, resembling a traditional sushi menu, was handed out to the audience upon admittance to the venue. Audiences were allowed to pick seven songs from the "menu" and the setlist for each show was derived from these ballots.

In 2003, the band auctioned off a live show to the winner of an eBay auction. The band subsequently performed this concert at Duke O'Briens, a pub in Crystal Lake, IL.

In July 2007, Local H played an early morning show at U.S. Cellular Field in Chicago at the conclusion of the Nike Rock 'N Run 5K race, where runners ended the race on the field.  Tickets to this show were only available by spotting Scott Lucas in public and speaking the phrase "Attention all planets of the Solar Federation, we have assumed control" directly to him. Later that same year, Local H announced a contest in which fans could make videos of themselves covering Local H songs.  The winner would then get to be the opening act for Local H's New Year's Eve show later that year. A band from New York called Kung-Fu Grip won the contest with their cover of a song from Local H's No Fun E.P.

During the spring months of 2010, Local H embarked on their "6 Angry Records" Tour. Each show began with Scott holding a hat filled with slips of paper containing the band's album names. After interviewing members of the audience about which album they'd like to hear, one audience member would choose an album from the hat. The band would then play that album on the spot in its entirety, followed by an encore of other Local H favorites and covers.

Band members
Current members
Scott Lucas – guitar, lead vocals, percussion, xylophone, synthesizer, organ (1987–present)
Ryan Harding – drums, percussion, bass, backing vocals (2013–present)

Former members
Matt  Garcia – bass guitar, vocals (1987–1993)
Toby (Tobey) Flescher – guitar (1987)
John Sparkman – lead guitar (1987–1991)
Joe Daniels – drums, percussion, backing vocals, whistling, live bass, live guitar; performed lead guitar on September 3, 1993 on "Do You Feel Like We Do" (1987–1999, 2016)
Brian St. Clair – drums, percussion, backing vocals (1999–2013)

Touring musicians
Adam McCaffery – guitar, backing vocals (2018–present)
Chad Williams – bass guitar (2018–present)
Gabe Rodriguez – backing vocals, tambourine, kazoo, drums, whistle; performed drums on September 3, 1993 on "Do You Feel Like We Do", 1995 as an unofficial third member, at Edgefest in 1997, on Late Night with Conan O'Brien in 1998, and on Alive '05 in 2004 (1997, 1998, 2002, 2004, 2012, 2014, and other miscellaneous years)
Wes Kidd – lead guitar, backing vocals on the Pack Up the Cats tour and on Late Night with Conan O'Brien in 1998 (1998–1999)
Herb Rosen (1999)
Jason Batchko – drums, percussion (2008)
Pete Beeman – drums, percussion (2017)

Timeline

Discography

Studio albums

Extended plays

Live albums

Compilation albums

Demo releases

Concert Films

Singles

Split singles

Music videos

Compilations and soundtracks
The Great White Hype (1996) – "Feed" (featured in film only)
Sling Blade Soundtrack (1996) – "Smothered in Hugs"  (Guided by Voices)
 Kevin & Bean Present Christmastime In The LBC (1996) – "Disgruntled Christmas"
 Royal Flush: Live On-Air (1997) – "Bound for the Floor" (acoustic)
Gravesend Soundtrack (1997) – "Have Yourself a Merry Little Christmas" and "Tag-Along"
 93 One: Unplugged & Burnt Out (1998) – "Bound for the Floor" (acoustic)
 Q101: Local 101 Volume One (1998) – "Talking Smack"
 Q101: Live 101 Volume One (1999) – "All the Kids Are Right" (live)
Where Is My Mind: A Tribute to the Pixies (1999) – "Tame" (Pixies)
Thick Records' Oil Compilation (2002) – "Mellowed" (early version)
Big Nothing (2006) – "Hands on the Bible" and "Bound for the Floor" (both featured in film only)

See also
List of alternative music artists

References

External links
 
Allmusic entry for Local H
Local H collection at the Internet Archive
Save Me from My Half-life Drive Documentary

1990 establishments in Illinois
Alternative rock groups from Illinois
American musical duos
American post-grunge musical groups
Male musical duos
Musical groups established in 1990
Musical groups from Chicago
Rock music duos
Zion, Illinois